Shameless may refer to:

Television and cinema
 Shameless (British TV series), a UK television series that ran from 2004 to 2013
 Shameless, a 2007 HBO special by Louis C.K.
 Shameless (2008 film),  Czech film
 Shameless (American TV series), a U.S. television adaptation of the UK series that ran from 2011 to 2021
 Shameless (2012 film), Polish film
 The Shameless, 2015 South Korean film

Music 
 "Shameless" (Billy Joel song), 1991, later covered by Garth Brooks
 "Shameless", a song by Pet Shop Boys from the album Alternative, 1995
 "Shameless", a song by Ani DiFranco from the album Dilate, 1996
 "Shameless", a song by Shabűtie from the EP The Penelope EP, 1999
 Shameless (album), a 2001 album by Therapy?
 "Shameless", a song by Cracker from the album Forever, 2002
 "Shameless", a song by All Time Low from the album So Wrong, It's Right, 2007
 "Shameless", a song by The Fratellis from the album Here We Stand, 2008
 "Shameless", a song by Kids in Glass Houses from the album Smart Casual, 2008
 "Shameless", a song by Man Man from the album Life Fantastic, 2011
 "Shameless" (Luca Hänni song), 2013
 "Shameless", a song by the Weeknd from the album Beauty Behind the Madness, 2015
 "Shameless" (Camila Cabello song), 2019
 "Shameless", a song by Jared Lee which represented Massachusetts in the American Song Contest, 2022

Other uses 
 Shameless (magazine), a Canadian feminist magazine for girls
 Shameless (podcast), an Australian pop culture popcast